Pingasa javensis is a moth of the family Geometridae first described by William Warren in 1894. It is found on Java.

References

Moths described in 1894
Pseudoterpnini